Maharshi is a 2019 Indian Telugu-language action drama film directed by Vamshi Paidipally and produced by Sri Venkateswara Creations, Vyjayanthi Movies, and PVP Cinema. It stars Mahesh Babu, Pooja Hegde and Allari Naresh. The music was composed by Devi Sri Prasad. The film was released on 9 May 2019.

Maharshi received mixed reviews from critics. Although cast performances, action sequences, plot, emotional quotient and technical aspects were praised, the film was criticized for its predictable and lengthy narrative. With a worldwide gross of 175–200 crore worldwide, Maharshi is the third highest grossing Telugu film of 2019 and one of the highest-grossing Telugu films. At 67th National Film Awards, Maharshi won the Best Popular Film Providing Wholesome Entertainment and Best Choreography. The film also won five SIIMA Awards and two Zee Cine Awards Telugu.

Plot 
K. Rishi Kumar is announced as the Chief Executive Officer of Origin, a flourishing company based in United States of America. He brings his mother from India to stay with him. Priya, his colleague organizes a party to surprise him, which would be attended by his close childhood friend Kanna, who had not met him for a few years, professor Chandrashekar and college friends. The story flashes back. 

Seven years ago, Rishi belonged to a middle-class nuclear family in Hyderabad; his father Satyanarayana, a clerk in a private corporation incurred debts as a result of his low earnings whose 'failure' caused Rishi to be not on good terms with him. Rishi secured an admission to complete his post-graduation in IIET, an esteemed university situated in Vizag and hence had to move. Rishi, his roommate Ravi Shankar and Pooja, all of them being classmates became best friends to each other. Ravi is the son of a poor farmer, whose innocent expectations about his son inspired and in reality, pressured him to aim at getting a well-earning job in America. Ajay, a classmate of them was envious of Rishi as the latter had surpassed him in studies while Pooja, by introducing Rishi to her typical Indian joint family expressed her feelings for him receiving positive response. Ravi failed in first semester examinations while Rishi secured first rank in it. Ravi became depressed when he got two backlogs in first semester examinations but Rishi encouraged him to trust himself and get inspired from his father but not to feel bulldozed by it. During campus placements, Ravi secured a good job making his father, girlfriend Pallavi and the latter's father, a good friend of Ravi's father delighted. Pooja rejected a job at Infosys to be with Rishi in the US as he had thrown an offer for his AI-operating system idea to Origin, which was accepted. 

However, Rishi suggested that he and Pooja should put an end to their relationship mutually as he felt that she would become an obstacle to his career and said her is a burden in his heart and hearing that she left. When Ravi tried to apprehend Rishi to not break up with pooja but it led to a fallout between them. As the last semester examinations approached, Rishi was accused of stealing the question papers which was actually a conspiracy engineered by Ajay to stop him from attempting his exams. However, upon getting a clue that proved the allegation against Rishi wrong, the Police let go of him. After completing his examinations, Rishi moved to New York City and rose through ranks becoming a leading executive in Origin. During his presentation about his project, Rishi learnt that his father succumbed to his illness in his sleep and he returned to India, only to realize that his father loved him more than anything and missed him as Rishi barely spoke to him. Rishi remained distraught over not being able to talk to his father heartfully. 

At present, Rishi inquires Chandrashekar about Ravi, post which the former discloses that Ravi was rusticated from the university as he had taken the blame for allegation against Rishi to protect him that caused his father to commit suicide. Devastated and guilty and upon being advised by his mother, Rishi takes a long-term leave and flies to India with her and Kanna to take Ravi with him to the USA. He meets Ravi in his native village Ramavaram, protesting alone against a pipeline transport project that requires demolition of Ramavaram. While Pallavi's father, the village's representative who doesn't want to leave the village but is helpless, tries negotiating for fair prices for the land the villagers are supposed to leave, Ravi never wants the project to take place but receives no support for his protest. Rishi, realizing that Ravi would never go with him, decides to get him what he wants. He meets the Chief Minister of Andhra Pradesh, who claims that he is helpless as one of the most influential businessmen, Vivek Mittal is handling the project. 

Rishi meets Vivek, requesting him to exclude Ramanavaram but he refuses to oblige. Rishi attracts the media by setting up an office in Ramavaram to manage his schedule and Pooja, a team leader in a reputed Video gaming company is sent along with her colleague to Ramavaram for meeting Rishi and negotiating a collaboration but by making excuses, Rishi asks her and her colleague stay in Ramavaram and work on her video game idea intending to reconcile but Pooja has no intentions of doing so as she was heart broken already and stays there under compulsion. When RIshi divulges to the media that he has set up his office  for his friend, the media asks Ravi about his intentions behind refusing to go with Rishi. Ravi reveals his attachment to the native village inspiring several other villagers to take up an initiative to join the protest amassing great attention nationwide. Pallavi's father, who blames Ravi for his father's death is now against his relationship with Pallavi. Upon learning about this, Rishi talks to Pallavi's father making him aware of Ravi's sacrifice post which Pallavi's father decides to accept her relationship with Ravi. Due to this act of him, Pooja decides to reconcile with Rishi while several other villages join the protest. 

Vivek, upon sensing trouble due to the protest, arrives at Ramavaram and out of ego, decides to quote a higher compensation attracting a group of people amongst the protestors. As a result, Ravi is stabbed by the henchmen of a neighbouring village's head who is bribed by Vivek but Rishi rescues him from being murdered and he is hospitalized. Vivek, in an interview, accuses Rishi of demanding a share in the project from him and claims that as a result of his rejection, started making use of Ravi. He questions where Rishi was all these years and why Ravi is remembered when he is protesting. Pooja too suspects Rishi's intentions and blames him for Ravi's situation and told he has not change a bit which broke his heart the most and he decided to leave the village. However, his mother encourages Rishi by revealing that Satyanarayana was not a failure, passed his UPSC examinations and got selected for the interview but was arrested for protesting in favour of suppressed farmers leading to him being disqualified but he never regretted and treated it as a failure because it was for a good cause. Rishi goes back to Ramavaram to finish what he started and a farmer inspires him to cultivate. Rishi also leases lands to the farmers encouraging them to get into agriculture quoting a higher price than Vivek. Later, in a press meet, Rishi delivers a heart-wrenching speech about how farmers are mistreated and taken advantage of leading to several suicides. The farmers realize the value of their lands and refuse to go with the pipeline project and Pooja reconciles with Rishi after seeing his speech. Ajay, who has now realized his mistake and is a leading bank official exposes Vivek's fraudulent intentions to evade debts behind initiating the project and acquiring the lands. As a consequence, the project is shelved and Vivek is arrested. 

It's time for Rishi to go to the USA back to his job but he decides not to, realizing that his happiness lies in the village and resorts to getting into agriculture.

Cast

 Mahesh Babu as K. Rishi Kumar, a US-based businessman
 Pooja Hegde as Pooja Mahalakshmi, Rishi's love interest
 Allari Naresh as Ravi Shankar, Rishi's best friend
 Jagapathi Babu as Vivek Mittal, a Mumbai-based businessman
 Kaikala Satyanarayana as Trivikram, Pooja's paternal grandfather
 Kota Srinivasa Rao as Kasthuri Ram, Pooja's maternal grandfather
 Prakash Raj as K. Satyanarayana, Rishi's father
 Jayasudha as Yashoda, Rishi's mother
 Meenakshi Dixit as Priya
 Ananya as Pallavi, Ravi's love interest
 Nassar as Chief Minister Jaidev Das
 Sai Kumar as Ramesh, Pallavi's father
 Rao Ramesh as Chandrasekhar Roy, Rishi's professor
 Mukesh Rishi as MP Bhanu Prasad, Ajay's father
 Tanikella Bharani as Shivaan Shankar, Ravi's father
 Posani Krishna Murali as Murali Krishna, Vivek's supporter
 Srinivasa Reddy as Ramakrishna, Rishi's personal assistant
 Vennela Kishore as Kanna, Rishi's childhood friend
 Kamal Kamaraju as S. Ajay Babu, Rishi's college mate
 Brahmaji as Babu, Pooja's manager
 Rajiv Kanakala as Farmer
 Prudhviraj as Journalist
 Anish Kuruvilla as Venkatraman, the college dean
 Ravi Prakash as Police Officer
 Vidyullekha Raman as Sunamwari, Pooja's friend
 Meenakshi Dixit as Nidhi
 Jhansi as TV Host
 Annapoorna as Devi, Pooja's grandmother
 Sameer as Interview Panel Member
 Randhir Gattla as Rahul
 Anand as District Collector of Ramavaram
 Shanoor Sana
 Sivannarayana as Jaikant, Pooja's uncle
 Divi Vadthya as Geetha
 Sravan as Shravan
 Ishika Varma
 Patricia Pinto
 Nicholas Pinto
 Ashrita Vemuganti
 Getup Srinu as a villager in Ramavaram 
 Mahesh Achanta as a villager in Ramavaram

Production

Development 
After successfully producing three films – Munna (2007), Brindavanam (2010) and Yevadu (2014) – Dil Raju announced his fourth collaboration with Vamshi Paidipally in early 2018, under Sri Venkateswara Creations. The film was launched under the tentative title #SSMB25, before the title Maharshi was confirmed on 9 August 2018. Speaking to Hemanth Kumar of Firstpost about the script writing, Vamshi said  "One of the toughest parts while writing the script was adding multiple layers to the protagonist's journey. “We were quite clear that we weren’t going to tell a story. It had to be like a semi-biopic. We didn’t want to treat the character like a hero right from the beginning. It's about a character who becomes a hero in the end".

Filming 
After the script work was done for a long time, principal photography of the film began in June 2018. A brief first schedule of the filming took place in Hyderabad, Goa and Dehradun. The team next headed to the United States for a two-month long schedule. The major part of the film in the second schedule was shot in New York. After a delay in the U.S. schedule, filming in the region was completed by November 2018.

Soon, the team resumed the shoot in Hyderabad at Ramoji Film City, where a fictional village set was constructed. Vamshi initially planned to shoot the film at a real village, but later decided to shoot it in a set, as they realized that controlling the crowd in real places is tough and risky. It was reported that the set was constructed at a cost of ₹8 crore. The schedule lasted until the third week of December 2018. The team then took brief break, with Mahesh Babu and his family going to Dubai for a short holiday. Filming was resumed in the second week of January 2019. The schedule took place in Pollachi, Tamil Nadu, and was completed within the same month. The next schedule took place in February 2019. In February Sri Venkateswara Creations announced that the filming would be completed by 15 March 2019, except for two songs. However, the shooting of the film was wrapped up on 18 April 2019.

Soundtrack

The film's soundtrack album and background music were composed by Devi Sri Prasad. All lyrics were written by Sri Mani. The complete soundtrack album was released on 1 May 2019 at the film's pre-release event, where various music artistes performed the songs.

Release
The film was originally scheduled to release on 25 April 2019. On 6 March 2019, Dil Raju announced that the film would be postponed due to delay in the post-production work. The film was released theatrically on 9 May 2019. Maharshi was released on 8 May 2019 (a day before its official release in India) across 2500 screens in the United States. In Bengaluru, the film was released across 400 screens, thus becoming the first Telugu film to have a high screen count, of the time.

On 8 May 2019, a day before the release of the film, a few officers from the Income Tax Department made a raid at Dil Raju's office and his house, in Hyderabad.

The film was also dubbed and released in 2020 in Tamil (as Ungalukkaga Oruvan), Kannada (as Veera Maharshi) and Malayalam.

Distribution 
The film's pre-release business, which includes theatrical, overseas, satellite, digital, music and dubbing rights, were sold for ₹150 crore. The worldwide theatrical rights of the film were sold for ₹100 crore. The region-wise breakdown of the rights are: ₹24 crore (Nizam), ₹12.60 crore (ceded), ₹9.60 (Uttarandhra), ₹7.70 (Guntur) ₹7.20 (East Godavari), ₹6 crore (West Godavari), ₹6 crore (Krishna), ₹2.90 (Nellore) ₹8.3 crore (Karnataka), ₹1.7 crore (rest of India) and ₹14 crore (overseas). Hindi dubbing rights of the film were sold to Goldmines Telefilms for ₹20 crore. The other area-wise distributors are: Narasimha Reddy (ceded region), Great India Films (United States), Southern Star International (Australia and New Zealand), Vintage Creations (East Godavari), Adhitya Films (West Godavari), Phars Film (United Arab Emirates), Sri Venkateswara Creations (Nizam and Uttarandhra), V Movies (Guntur), Rising Star Entertainment (United Kingdom), G3 Movies (Krishna) and Swagath Enterprises (Karnataka).

Marketing 
A 43-second video titled #MeetRishi was released on 9 August 2018, coinciding with Mahesh Babu's birthday. The video revealed the character played by Babu in the film. On 10 March 2019, Mahesh Babu shared a few behind-the-scenes pictures in the social media. The official teaser of the film titled #JoinRishi was released on Ugadi, 6 April 2019. To promote the film, a pre-release event was held on 1 May 2019, at People's Plaza, Necklace Road, Hyderabad. The official trailer and complete audio album of the film were released at the event. Various music artistes of the soundtrack album performed songs from the film. Vijay Deverakonda and Venkatesh were the chief guests of the event. On 16 May 2019, an interactive event titled Maharshulatho Maharshi was held in Hyderabad, in which Paidipally and Babu had an interaction/interview with the farmers. Later, a similar event titled Repati Maharshulatho Maharshi was held, in which both of them interacted with the school students of The Hyderabad Public School. Eight days after the release, an event was held at Vijayawada, Andhra Pradesh, to celebrate the film's success. The event, titled Maharshi Vijayotsavam, was held on 18 May 2019. In June 2019, the event Celebrating Maharshi was held at Shilpakala Vedika, Hyderabad, to celebrate the film's 50 day run in 211 movie theaters across India.

Home media 
The satellite rights of the film were purchased by Sun TV Network for ₹25 crore, and the Telugu version was sold for Gemini TV for ₹16.5 crore. The film's Telugu version television premiere took place on Gemini TV on 6 October 2019, coinciding with Dussehra.

Its premiere on television registered a target rating point (TRP) rating of 9.3, whereas its fifth-time premiere on the channel registered a TRP rating of 10.28. On an average, the TRP ratings of other premieres are also more than 4.

The film's digital rights were acquired by Amazon Prime Video for ₹11 crores, and it premiered on 3 July 2019, 54 days after the film's theatrical release. The digital and satellite rights of the Tamil and Kannada dubbed versions of the film were acquired by Star India. The Tamil, Kannada and Malayalam dubbed versions of the film premiered on Star Vijay, Star Suvarna and Zee Keralam respectively, on 18 October 2020.

Reception

Critical reception 
Maharshi received mixed reviews from the critics who praised the cast performances, action sequences, technical aspects, plot and emotional quotent while criticising the predictable and lengthy narration. Sangeetha Devi Dundoo of The Hindu wrote, "At the heart of Maharshi is a story that could have been leveraged to make a compelling social drama that also traces the transformative journey of an ambitious man. But there’s a huge gap between what it could have been and what it is". The Times of India'''s Neeshita Nyayapati gave a rating of 3 out of 5 and wrote that "Watch it not just for Mahesh Babu and Allari Naresh’s performances but also for the story, if you don’t mind all the bells and whistles it comes with. It might not be entertaining all through, thanks to the draggy bits, but its heart is in the right place". Writing for Hindustan Times, Karthik Kumar opined "Maharshi is a problematic film with big ideas but it tugs at heartstrings. Take out the farming sub-plot, Maharshi would’ve been a tiresome watch in which Rishi just won’t shut up with his sermons on success". Sify criticized the film's narration and duration. The reviewer felt that the film has predictable storyline, lacks any shred of originality, the second half is totally unsatisfied and the emotional core is not convincing. Sakshi Post opined that acting performances of Babu and Naresh and the direction are the film's positives, while Devi's soundtrack and poor screenplay are the drawbacks of the film.News18 stated "Maharshi exudes a sense of comfort and happiness in the midst of the wreckage and targeting". India Today gave 2.5 out of 5 stars stating "Maharshi has a meaty story in between several sub-plots. If only it was crisp and to the point. If only. Mahesh Babu's Maharshi is not about a business tycoon coming back to his motherland. He has a bigger purpose here". Hemanth Kumar of Firstpost praised cinematography, performances of lead actors and film score, adding: "Maharshi is a well-intentioned drama and has some beautifully written sequences; however, it holds back on a lot of things it wants to say for so long that it makes you feel restless at times". A critic of Deccan Chronicle too praised cinematography, performances of lead actors and film score, giving a rating of three-and-half out of five. Gabbeta Ranjith Kumar of The Indian Express cited the film as "crowd pleaser", giving a final verdict – "Vamshi Paidipally handles an emotionally intense subject well. But, the director could have paid more attention to Maharshi’s run-time. He could have chopped two masala songs which act as speed bumps."

Krishna Sripada of The News Minute gave a rating of 3 out of 5 and opined that the film is "strictly for the fans", writing that "Maharshi has plenty to keep the fans whistling. Naresh's character is well-written, and it is his role that offers the pivotal turning point in the movie. Which makes you wonder why he watches a big chunk of the climax from the sidelines, as if he were there only for emotion-capture, like the relative of a KBC contestant." He further wrote "Prakash Raj, Rao Ramesh and Tanikella Bharani - we have almost lost the art of making our character artists important in giving more and more space to the hero. I mean, come on, even Iron Man concedes space to others. Mahesh does these roles effortlessly and one wonders if there is a pattern behind three successive social-message-based, larger-than-life movies. A change, maybe? One for the actor in him, and not just to please the fans!". Sankeertana Varma of Film Companion opined the same, stating, "Maharshi might just be a delightful movie for a Mahesh Babu fan—after all, it’s mostly him achieving this and that, and running to save people left and right—but for a fan of the movies, it offers nothing."The Quint also criticized film's weak narration, predictable storyline, while appreciated Vamshi's work and DSP's score composition. About Vamshi's work, the critic wrote "Like Vamshi Paidipalli’s previous film Oopiri, Maharshi oozes with the intense desire to share something of value with the audience. The message that farmers need to be valued. And that youngsters can achieve anything they set their mind to."  Murali Krishna CH of The New Indian Express called it "an overlong melodramatic journey," criticizing its runtime. "[T]he journey of Mahesh Babu's Rishi is way too long and demands much patience on our part," he added. In contrast, a critic of The Free Press Journal rated the film four out of five, writing "Maharshi exudes a sense of comfort and happiness in the midst of the wreckage and targeting." Business Standard too gave a rating of 4 out of 5, writing "The first-half with its quaint college is heartwarming without trying to be excessively cute. Mahesh Babu's transformative performance from arrogant conceit to conscientious farmer is arguably his best to date."

 Box office 
On opening day, the film collected a gross collection of 59 crore worldwide. In the Telugu-speaking states of India, it collected a gross collection of 33.3 crore and a distributors' share collection of 24.6 crore. On its opening day, the film collected a gross of $511,000 (3.57) at the United States box office, AU$100,000 in Australia and 23 lakhs in Chennai. In its second day of release, the film earned a distributors' share of 32.57 crore in Andhra Pradesh and Telangana. In three days, the film collected a gross of $1,158,000 at the United States box office.

In the first extended weekend (Thursday release), the film grossed 100 crore worldwide and entered the 100 Crore Club. By the end of its first weekend, the film had earned a distributors' share collection of 3.45 crore in Bengaluru. On the fifth day, it grossed over 6 crore in Andhra Pradesh and Telangana, totalling 75 crore gross and 53.45 share, in the region. By the sixth day of its release, it had collected a gross of $1,500,000 in the United States, making it the sixth film to cross the mark in Babu's career. In seven days, it grossed over 8 crore at the United Arab Emirates box office. In 11 days, the film collected 72.79 crore in Telugu-speaking states (Andhra Pradesh and Telangana). By the end of its theatrical run, the film had grossed between 187200 crore worldwide, while in the international market the film earned a gross collection of 25 crore and a distributors' share collection of 12.50 crore.

 Accolades 

 Impact 
Although Maharshi received mixed reviews from critics, it was featured on the various year-end best film charts. Hindustan Times'' considered Allari Naresh's performance in the film as one his five best performances in his career. Several popular personalities in India praised the film including Chiranjeevi, Sudheer Babu, AR Murugadoss, Sukumar, Ileana D'Cruz, Harish Shankar, Srinu Vaitla, Karan Johar, Samantha Akkineni, Shruti Haasan. On 14 May 2019, Vice President of India Venkaiah Naidu, has lauded the film through his Twitter account, and wrote that "By portraying a rural theme, the film highlights the need for farm conservation and support for the elderly. Maharshi is a remarkable film that everyone needs to watch. It showcases the glory of the rural population and the importance of agriculture."

After the release of the film, the concept of weekend farming (also known as weekend agriculture) gained more attention. A new internet challenge. i.e. Agriculture Challenge was started, with several people do farming in the weekends. The Statesman reported that the film has created a social impact on the youth and raised awareness about the issues faced by farmers in the rural heartland. In February 2020, Rajiv Gandhi University of Knowledge Technologies organized the contest "Campus Farming". 250 students of the university participated in this contest.

At an event in May 2019, Mahesh Babu revealed that the character he played and the film made a huge impact on his life. He further said that "Once you live in a village, it becomes a part of you. Two years ago, when I first heard the script, I was a different man, the film has changed me and helped me reconnect with my roots. I’m a new Mahesh Babu today".

Notes

References

External links
 

2019 films
Films scored by Devi Sri Prasad
2010s Telugu-language films
2019 action drama films
2010s business films
Indian action drama films
Indian buddy films
Indian coming-of-age drama films
2010s coming-of-age drama films
Films about friendship
Films about businesspeople
Films about farmers' suicides in India
Films about social issues in India
Films about the education system in India
Films about poverty in India
Films set in Andhra Pradesh
Films shot in Andhra Pradesh
Films shot in Hyderabad, India
Films set in Manhattan
Films set in New York City
Films shot in Europe
Films set in universities and colleges
Indian nonlinear narrative films
Films directed by Vamshi Paidipally
Best Popular Film Providing Wholesome Entertainment National Film Award winners
Sri Venkateswara Creations films
Films set in Visakhapatnam
Films shot in Goa
Films shot at Ramoji Film City
Films shot in Uttarakhand
Films shot in Pollachi
Indian films set in New York City